Dianne Kenneth Matias (born 2 February 1985) is a Filipino-American former professional tennis player.

Born in Balagtas, Philippines, Matias was six years of age when her family emigrated to the United States and she grew up in the South Bay region of Los Angeles County. She played collegiate tennis for the University of Southern California between 2003 and 2007, earning a best national ranking of 32. Her two younger brothers, Ace and Ivan, also competed at collegiate level.

Matias reached a best singles world ranking of 670 on the professional tour. In 2006, she featured in the qualifying draw for the Indian Wells Open (WTA Tour event) and was eliminated by Victoria Azarenka. She won three bronze medals for the Philippines at the 2007 Southeast Asian Games. In 2008, she represented the Philippines Fed Cup team in three ties, against Syria, South Korea and Singapore. Undefeated, she won her only singles match and both of her doubles rubbers.

From 2013 to 2021, Matias served as the head women's coach for Cal State Fullerton.

ITF finals

Singles (0–1)

Doubles (1–0)

References

External links
 
 
 

1985 births
Living people
Filipino female tennis players
American female tennis players
Filipino emigrants to the United States
Tennis people from California
Sportspeople from Los Angeles County, California
Sportspeople from Bulacan
USC Trojans women's tennis players
Competitors at the 2007 Southeast Asian Games
Southeast Asian Games bronze medalists for the Philippines
Southeast Asian Games medalists in tennis
Cal State Fullerton Titans coaches
College tennis coaches in the United States
American tennis coaches